Bignell may refer to:

People with the surname
 Arthur Bignell (1861–1944), former Mayor of Whanganui, New Zealand
 Bernie Bignell (1917–1967), Australian rules footballer
 George Bignell (1858–1925), American baseball player
 George Carter Bignell (1826–1910), English entomologist
 Guy Bignell (1886–1965), English cricketer
 Hugh Bignell (1882–1907), Indian born English cricketer
 Joseph Maltby Bignell (1827–1887), British architect
 Larry Bignell (born 1950), retired professional Ice hockey defenceman from Edmonton, Alberta, Canada
 Leon Bignell (born 1966), Australian politician
 Mark Bignell (born in 1979), US politician
 Richard Bignell (disambiguation), one of several people
 Roderick Bignell Weir (born 1927), New Zealand businessman
 Tim Bignell, Australian bass guitarist from the band Epicure
 Kevin Sacre (born Kevin Bignell in 1978), British actor

Place names
Bignell, Nebraska, a community in the United States
Bignell Creek, a tributary of Adolphe-Poisson Bay, in La Tuque, Mauricie, Quebec, Canada

See also
 Bagnell (disambiguation)
 Bignall (disambiguation)